The 1962 Houston Oilers season was the third season for the Houston Oilers as a professional American football franchise; For the third consecutive season, the Oilers appeared in the AFL Championship Game, only to lose 20–17 in double overtime to the Dallas Texans. In this season, quarterback George Blanda set the single season record for most interceptions, throwing 42.

Offseason

AFL Draft

Regular season

Standings

Season schedule

Roster

Postseason

AFL Championship Game

Dallas Texans 20, Houston Oilers 17 (2OT)
December 23, 1962, at Jeppesen Stadium, Houston, TexasAttendance: 37,981

Scoring
DAL – Field goal Brooker 16
DAL – Haynes 28 pass from Dawson (Brooker kick)
DAL – Haynes 2 run (Brooker kick)
HOU – Dewveall 15 pass from Blanda (Blanda kick)
HOU – Field goal Blanda 31
HOU – Tolar 1 run (Blanda kick)
DAL – Field goal Brooker 25

References
 Oilers on Pro Football Reference
 Oilers on jt-sw.com

Houston Oilers
Houston Oilers seasons
Houston